The 1997 Asia Cup (also known as the Pepsi Asia Cup 1997) was the sixth Asia Cup tournament, and the second to be held in Sri Lanka. The tournament took place between July 14–26, 1997. Four teams took part in the tournament: India, Pakistan, Sri Lanka and Bangladesh.

The 1997 Asia Cup was a round-robin tournament where each team played the other once, and the top two teams qualifying for a place in the final. India and Sri Lanka qualified for the final where Sri Lanka won by 8 wickets to win its second Asia Cup and ending India's three consecutive championship run.

Squads

Matches

Group stage

Final

Statistics

Most runs

Most wickets

See also
 Asia Cup

References

 ESPN Cricinfo: Asia Cup in Sri Lanka, Jul 1997 http://www.espncricinfo.com/ci/engine/series/61008.html

External links
 Cricket archive tournament page

1997
1997 in Sri Lankan cricket
International cricket competitions from 1994–95 to 1997
Cricket, Asia Cup, 1997
International cricket competitions in Sri Lanka
July 1997 sports events in Asia